Jackie Dawson is a Canadian academic who holds the Canada Research Chair (Tier 2) in Environment, Society and Policy. Dawson is also co-Scientific Director of ArcticNet, where she is currently a member of the Board of Directors.

Biography 
Dawson graduated in 1997 from Barrie North Collegiate Institute in Barrie, Ontario, Canada. In 2019, she was inducted into the Barrie North Collegiate Institute Wall of Honour. Dawson completed a Master's in 2003 at the University of Otago, with a thesis on environmental values of marine tourists.

Research 
Dawson's research focuses on the impacts of Ecotourism in the Canadian arctic and sub-arctic, and also on how maritime shipping in a time of climate warming will affect the Canadian arctic, both terrestrial Inuit communities and culturally significant marine protected areas.

Dawson is a lead author on the Intergovernmental Panel on Climate Change 6th Assessment Report.

Scientific community service and leadership 
Dawson is a member of the Global Young Academy, which aims to give "a voice to young scientists around the world."

Her arctic research practice emphasizes collaboration with Inuit colleagues in communities across Nunavut and beyond.

In May 2021, the Arctic Corridors Research Project that Dawson leads, with colleagues, Natalie Carter, Natasha Simonee and Shirley Tagalik, received a Governor General's Innovation Award.  The project "consulted with 14 northern communities — seven in Nunavut — to find out how to best protect culturally significant marine areas in the Arctic as ship traffic increases".

Honours and awards 
2021 Governor General of Canada's Innovation Awards
2017 Early Career Researcher of the Year Award, University of Ottawa
2016 Early Career Researcher of the Year Award, Faculty of Arts, University of Ottawa
2016 Member of the Royal Society of Canada's College of New Scholars, Artists and Scientists
2016 Elected Member of the Global Young Academy
2015 Fellow of the Royal Canadian Geographical Society
2015 Government of Ontario Early Researcher Award recipient

Selected bibliography 
Jackie Dawson, Emma J. Stewart, Harvey Lemelin & Daniel Scott (2010) The carbon cost of polar bear viewing tourism in Churchill, Canada. Journal of Sustainable Tourism 18:3, 319–336, DOI: http://10.1080/09669580903215147
J. Dawson, M. J. Johnston, E. J. Stewart, C. J. Lemieux, R. H. Lemelin, P. T. Maher & B. S.R Grimwood (2011) Ethical considerations of last chance tourism. Journal of Ecotourism 10:3, 250–265. DOI: http://10.1080/14724049.2011.617449
J. Dawson, M.E. Johnston, E.J. Stewart (2014) Governance of Arctic expedition cruise ships in a time of rapid environmental and economic change. Ocean & Coastal Management 89: 88–99. https://doi.org/10.1016/j.ocecoaman.2013.12.005.
Dawson, J., Pizzolato, L., Howell, S., Copland, L., & Johnston, M. (2018). Temporal and Spatial Patterns of Ship Traffic in the Canadian Arctic from 1990 to 2015. Arctic 71(1), 15–26. Retrieved July 13, 2021, from https://www.jstor.org/stable/26387327

References

External links 
 https://www.jackiedawson.ca/
 https://research.uottawa.ca/people/dawson-jackie

Living people
Canadian women academics
Canadian geographers
Canada Research Chairs
University of Waterloo alumni
Academic staff of the University of Ottawa
University of Otago alumni
Lakehead University alumni
Royal Canadian Geographical Society fellows
Royal Canadian Geographical Society
Geography
Year of birth missing (living people)